The Association for Better Living and Education (ABLE) is a non-profit organization headquartered in Los Angeles, California, established by the Church of Scientology. It states that it is "dedicated to creating a better future for children and communities." It promotes secular uses of L. Ron Hubbard's works, and has been classified as a "Scientology-related entity". Founded in 1988, ABLE's main office is located at 7065 Hollywood Boulevard, the former headquarters for the Screen Actors Guild.

Programs
ABLE acts as an umbrella organization for four entities:
Applied Scholastics, educational programs based on study technology
Criminon, a rehabilitation program for prisoners
Narconon, a drug rehabilitation program
The Way to Happiness Foundation, dedicated to disseminating Hubbard's "non-religious moral code", which consists of 21 precepts such as "Don't be promiscuous", "Do not harm a person of good will" and "Respect the religious beliefs of others"

Criticism
Although various Scientology groups are registered as legally separate corporations and entities, critics note this has no bearing on whether or not they are controlled by the Church of Scientology. Studytech.org, a Scientology watchdog site, notes: "Applied Scholastics is indeed a legally separate corporation. However, it has so many ties to the Church of Scientology and its corporate alter ego, the Church of Spiritual Technology, that it cannot be regarded as being anything other than a Scientology subsidiary.

Nanette Asimov, reporter for the San Francisco Chronicle, in an article critical of ABLE and Narconon, summed it up this way:
A popular anti-drug program provided free to schools in San Francisco and elsewhere teaches concepts straight out of the Church of Scientology, including medical theories that some addiction experts described as "irresponsible" and "pseudoscience." As a result, students are being introduced to some beliefs and methods of Scientology without their knowledge.

ABLE and its groups were included in the 1993 closing agreement between the IRS and the Church of Scientology, and are classified as "Scientology-related entities".

See also
Applied Scholastics
Criminon
Narconon
The Way to Happiness

References

Further reading

External links

Scientology organizations
Organizations established in 1988
Organizations based in Los Angeles